Peter Glacier is a short, broad glacier draining northeast into Jutulstraumen Glacier just east of Neumayer Cliffs and Melleby Peak in Queen Maud Land. Mapped by Norwegian cartographers from surveys and air photos by Norwegian-British-Swedish Antarctic Expedition (NBSAE) (1949–52) and air photos by the Norwegian expedition (1958–59). Named for Peter Melleby who was in charge of sledge dogs with the NBSAE.

See also
 List of glaciers in the Antarctic
 Glaciology
 Skarvhalsen Saddle

References
 

Glaciers of Queen Maud Land
Princess Martha Coast